Kimswerd is a village in Súdwest-Fryslân municipality in the province of Friesland, the Netherlands. It had a population of around 565 in January 2017.

History
The village was first mentioned in the 13th century as Kemmerswerth, and means "terp village of Kemme (person). Kimswerd is a terp (artificial living hill) village. Archaelogical finds have been discovered in the terp from the Roman era. The village used to have a grid structure and was located along the former Marneslenk, a bay in the Wadden Sea. Around 1850, the road from Bolsward to Harlingen was paved, and the village extended towards the road.

The Dutch Reformed church dates from the 11th century, and has a tower from the 12th century. It was modified and extended many times during its history.

On 29 January 1515, Kimswerd was plundered by Saxon mercenaries hired by the Count of Holland to conquer Friesland. Pier Gerlofs Donia who lost his wife and one of his two children swore revenge, and founded the Arumer Zwarte Hoop, a guerilla army which plundered and raided cities in Holland.

Kimswerd was home to 408 people in 1840. Before 2011, the village was part of the Wûnseradiel municipality.

Notable people 
Pier Gerlofs Donia, nicknamed Grutte Pier, an infamous freedom fighter born around 1480, who led a guerrilla war against the occupying forces after his wife and one of his two children were killed, and burnt his farm in 1515. He led the Frisian rebel army, the Arumer Zwarte Hoop from 1515 until 1519.

Gallery

References

External links

Súdwest-Fryslân
Populated places in Friesland